Manduca mossi is a moth of the  family Sphingidae. It is known from Peru, eastern Ecuador and Bolivia.

Adults have been recorded in January.

References

Manduca
Moths described in 1911